is a Japanese light novel series about space pirates written by Yūichi Sasamoto and illustrated by Noriyuki Matsumoto, published since October 2008. An anime television series adaptation produced by Satelight, under the title , aired in Japan from January to June 2012. A film adaptation was released in Japanese theaters in February 2014. A web manga adaptation launched in June 2012. Seven Seas Entertainment licensed the manga series for a printed release in North America in August 2015.

The anime version won the 2013 Seiun Award for Best Dramatic Presentation.

Plot
In the far future where space travel and colonialization have become the norm, humanity has expanded its living space to the far reaches of the known galaxy. One hundred years before the beginning of the series, several colonies, eager to gain their independence, rebelled against their masters in the Stellar Alliance Colony Federation. The government of one of the newly colonized planets,  in the Tau Ceti system, recruited Space Pirates to bolster its fighting forces, legalizing their actions by issuing them letters of marque.

In the midst of this conflict, a Galactic Empire arose and absorbed both the Stellar Alliance and the border worlds, but allowed the colonies to run on an independent government. Despite peace having been achieved, the Space Pirates remain respected figures in Imperial society, even though their activities are now reduced to more legal jobs (like errand running and staging raids for the entertainment of space travellers) in which their knowledge of the system's wild space proves particularly useful. At the time the series begins, their cessation of illegal activities is gradually causing them to pass into local legend.

Marika Kato is a high school girl living a rather ordinary life as a member of the space yacht club and a part-time job at the high-class retro Lamp Café. One day, Marika learns of her recently deceased father, Gonzaemon, who is revealed to have been a Space Pirate.

Characters

Main characters

A girl who is a member of her school's space yacht club and has a part time job as a waitress in a cafe. She learns one day about her recently deceased father, Gonzaemon Kato, who was a Space Pirate. As Gonzaemon's only descendant, she is chosen to become the new captain of the Bentenmaru. After joining her parents' former crew, she starts dividing her time between her studies, her part-time job and her duties aboard the Bentenmaru. It does not take long for her crewmates to confirm that Marika has what it takes to live up to her father's legacy.

A mysterious girl who transfers into Marika's school after she learns of her heritage, observing her while she decides about becoming a space pirate or not. Just like Marika, Chiaki is heir to another pirate ship, the Barbaroosa. Despite claiming she does not like when Marika gets too friendly with her, she truly cares for her and always lends a hand when needed. The only breach in her cold facade is her passion for ice parfaits, on which she partakes regularly whenever she visits the Lamp Café.

The Bentenmaru

The Bentenmaru's beautiful medic and unofficial first mate, and one of the crew's veterans from Gonzaemon Kato's leadership. At Hakuho Academy, she acts as the school's doctor.

The Bentenmaru's helmsman. At Hakuho Academy, he serves as adviser of the Space Yacht Club and homeroom teacher in Marika's class.

The Bentenmaru's radar and sensor specialist who likes to assemble model ships in his free time.

The Bentenmaru's electronic warfare specialist. She usually appears as a stereotypical nerd, constantly clad in her pajamas and thick coke bottle glasses, and eating snacks at her workstation. She is actually very attractive, but doesn't want anyone to notice, only using her looks as a last resort to get information from men.

The Bentenmaru's tactical officer. He is a cyborg and was a friend of Ririka during her space pirate years.

The Bentenmaru's engineer. While not busy, he enjoys collecting teddy bears.

The Bentenmaru's navigator and psychic whose cryptic warnings usually anger some of her crewmates.

Hakuoh Academy

Marika's closest school friend and a co-worker at the Lamp Café. Additionally, she is a member of the academy's knitting club, and has taken up the challenge of creating new "cute" uniforms for Marika's pirating job.

The President of the Space Yacht club and the heir of a major space shipping conglomerate. Following the first half of the series, she graduates and passes her position to Lynn. Later on, she runs away from an arranged marriage with the help of Marika's crew and Lynn, who is revealed to be her lover.

(Rin Lambretta in the English dub) The vice-president of the Space Yacht club. A troublemaker and skilled hacker, Lynn is a lesbian and Jenny's lover. After Jenny graduated, she took over her position as president. It was also revealed that she hacked the Nebula Cup Tournament 6 years ago and thus caused Hakuoh Academy to be suspended from participating in the race for 5 years.

A member of the Space Yacht club. Graduated after Marika begins her second year at high school.

A member of the Space Yacht club. Graduated after Marika begins her second year at high school.

A member of the Space Yacht club who wears sunglasses. Graduated after Marika begins her second year at high school.

A member of the Space Yacht club.

A member of the Space Yacht club.

A member of the Space Yacht club.

A member of the Space Yacht club.

A member of the Space Yacht club.

A member of the Space Yacht club.

A member of the Space Yacht club.

A member of the Space Yacht club.

A member of the Space Yacht club.

A member of the Space Yacht club who joins after Marika's second year at high school and has a natural talent as a pilot and helmsman. When the Bentenmaru's crew is hospitalized, she temporarily takes Kane's place as the ship's helmsman. She is also able to predict the wind currents in atmospheric flying and read the constellations for navigation.

A member of the Space Yacht club who joins after Marika's second year at high school.

A member of the Space Yacht club who joins after Marika's second year at highschool. Her expertise on old fashion engines was a great help when Marika and the Yacht Club used the Bentenmaru for a pirate job.

Serenity Kingdom Star System

The Seventh Princess of the Serenity Royal Family of the Serenity Star System who knew Marika's father, Gonzaemon. Gruier hires the Bentenmaru to help her find the Golden Ghost Ship, a first-generation colony transport ship whose descendants became the firsts settlers of Serenity. In truth, Gruier wants to search the ship to find the Artificial Womb room, a lab that genetically creates and births children for the Serenity Royal family. Due to political turmoil in the Serenity Kingdom, Gruier wishes to destroy the Artificial Womb so that no new heirs will be born, believing the Royal family's time has come to an end and Serenity should embrace republicanism to revive its former glory. However, this leads to conflict with her younger sister Grunhilde, who has other plans for the Artificial Womb. It is only after Marika's intervention that she stops the rivalry between the two sisters and also saves the newest and last Serenity Royal to be born from the womb. She later attends Hakuho Academy and joins the Space Yacht Club before Marika's second year starts. Despite being a princess, she is always seen hanging out with Marika, much to Grunhilde's concern, and helps Marika whenever she is in trouble.

The Eighth Princess of the Serenity Royal Family. She and her sister Gruier were in a conflict to find the legendary golden ghost ship as she wishes to use the Artificial Womb to birth a new heir that will end the Serenity Kingdom's political turmoil and revive its former glory. However, Marika manages to defuse the situation between the two sisters and repair their relationship. She later attends Hakuho Academy and joins the Space Yacht Club with her sister. At first she does not like her sister being too close to Marika as she is a pirate, but later she understand why her sister adores Marika and subsequently comes out of her own shell as well.

Grand Chamberlain of the Privy Council of the Serenity Star System.

Head of the Serenity Royal Family bodyguards.

Space Pirates

Captain of the pirate ship Barbaroosa, and father of Chiaki. He is on friendly terms with the Bentenmaru's crew and its captain.

 

The captain of the Imperial Pirate Ship Parabellum. Wears a mask and the gold skull of a recognized Imperial Pirate. In the last episode, he is revealed to be Gonzaemon Kato, Marika's father and Ririka's husband (although he keeps his actual survival secret from his daughter) and the narrator of the series.

Marika's mother and Gonzaemon's wife, who was once a space pirate herself known as "Blaster Ririka". Marika rarely calls her "Mother", instead calling her by her given name; however, Marika does call her "Mother" when she's serious. After leaving the Bentenmaru, Ririka started working as an Air Traffic Controller. Sometime after Marika becomes the captain of the Bentenmaru, she joins the crew of the Parabellum, under Captain Ironbeard.

Kane's younger twin brother and helmsman of the Parabellum.

Captain and pilot of the Grand Cross, a giant, next-generation experimental battleship. An Imperial Pirate, she battle tested the Grand Cross by destroying the space pirates of the frontier worlds, believing they no longer act like the pirates of old. It is only after the frontier pirates united under Marika's leadership that she is defeated. Quartz is hinted to be royalty due to the way Ironbeard talks to her and her relationship with the Empress of the Galactic Empire.

Others

The flamboyant head of the Harold Lloyd Insurance Union, and successor of the previous president, Harold, with whom the crew of the Bentenmaru - Ririka in particular - had often come to blows over professional issues. He acts both as an insurance agent for high-risk clients (such as pirates and cruise ships) and as an agent for the pirates, negotiating and setting up their "jobs" (such as flashy pirate attacks on cruise ships for the entertainment of the passengers).

A chef who runs an inconspicuous restaurant known only to pirates (and ex-pirates), and it is revealed that he is the son of the Legendary Chef who long ago united all pirates to fight in the War of Independence.

The head chef of the Pirate's Nest. Inheriting his father's title, he runs the Pirate's Nest, a neutral space station where space pirates meet and eat together, whether they be frontier or imperial space pirates.

Uncle of Jenny Doolittle and chairman of the Hugh and Dolittle interstellar transport company. Fearing Jenny rather than his son will inherit the company, he arranges a marriage between Jenny and a politician to prevent it. However, he is thwarted by Marika and her friends when they expose Jenny's fiance as the leader of an anti-government revolutionist group and Robert himself secretly selling illegal weapons to politicians and rebels.

Media

Light novels

The first novel of Miniskirt Space Pirates, written by Yūichi Sasamoto and illustrated by Noriyuki Matsumoto, was published by Asahi Shimbun on October 21, 2008 and the twelfth and last on August 20, 2014. The series was transferred to Kadokawa in 2018, who began reprinting it in the same year. A new series, Super Miniskirt Space Pirates, began publishing on July 25, 2019.

Anime

The anime adaptation, under the title  is produced by Satelight and directed by Tatsuo Satō. The anime aired on Tokyo MX, MBS and TVK between January 8, 2012 and June 30, 2012 and was also simulcast by Crunchyroll. The anime has been licensed in North America by Sentai Filmworks and released to digital outlets in February. The series was released on Blu-ray Disc and DVD with an English dub on January 8, 2013 (Vol 1) and March 5, 2013 (Vol 2). MVM Films have licensed the series in the United Kingdom and will release the series in two DVD boxsets from February 4, 2012. The ending theme song is "Lost Child" by Momoiro Clover Z.

Film
A film adaptation was announced following the end of the series. The film, titled , was released on February 22, 2014, with Satō returning as director and screenwriter.

Manga
A manga adaptation illustrated by Hiro Tōge began serialization in Asahi Shimbun's Nico Nico Asahi Comic Fantasy web manga publication on Nico Nico Seiga from June 2, 2012. A manga adaptation of the film illustrated by Chibimaru began serialization in Media Factory's Monthly Comic Alive from February 2014. The manga will be licensed in English by Seven Seas Entertainment, who will release the first volume in August 2015.  It will be based on the film version.

Reception
Erica Friedman of Yuricon praised Jenny and Lynn, two supporting characters in the anime, as not only strong female characters, but as a "perfect Yuri couple," and noting a moment between these characters in the second part of the anime.

References

External links
  
 Official English website 
 

2008 Japanese novels
2012 anime television series debuts
Anime and manga based on light novels
Anime films based on light novels
Japanese animated science fiction films
2010s Japanese-language films
Light novels
Mainichi Broadcasting System original programming
Media Factory manga
Satelight
Science fiction anime and manga
Seinen manga
Sentai Filmworks
Seven Seas Entertainment titles
Space opera novels
Television shows based on light novels
Pirates in anime and manga
Space pirates
Television series about pirates